The Howard Hughes Medical Institute (HHMI) is an American non-profit medical research organization based in Chevy Chase, Maryland. It was founded in 1953 by Howard Hughes, an American business magnate, investor, record-setting pilot, engineer, film director, and philanthropist, known during his lifetime as one of the most financially successful individuals in the world. It is one of the largest private funding organizations for biological and medical research in the United States. HHMI spends about $1 million per HHMI Investigator per year, which amounts to annual investment in biomedical research of about $825 million.

The institute has an endowment of $22.6 billion, making it the second-wealthiest philanthropic organization in the United States and the second-best endowed medical research foundation in the world.  HHMI is the former owner of the Hughes Aircraft Company – an American aerospace firm which was divested to various firms over time.

History 

The institute was formed with the goal of basic research including trying to understand, in Hughes's words, "the genesis of life itself." Despite its principles, in the early days it was generally viewed as a tax haven for Hughes's huge personal fortune. Hughes was HHMI's sole trustee and he transferred his stock of Hughes Aircraft to the institute, in effect turning the large defense contractor into a tax-exempt charity. For many years the Institute grappled with maintaining its non-profit status; the Internal Revenue Service challenged its "charitable" status which made it tax exempt. Partly in response to such claims, starting in the late 1950s it began funding 47 investigators doing research at eight different institutions; however, it remained a modest enterprise for several decades.

The institute was initially located in Miami, Florida, in 1953. Hughes's internist, Verne Mason, who treated Hughes after his 1946 plane crash, was chairman of the institute's medical advisory committee.  By 1975, Hughes was sole trustee of the Howard Hughes Medical Institute, which in turn owned all the stock of the Hughes Aircraft Company.

In 1969, Representative Wright Patman "complained that the Hughes foundation was a tax‐evasion device," noting that the institute spent only $5.7 million for its operations between 1954 and 1961, a period during which Hughes Aircraft accumulated $76.9 million in profits. By 1975, it had also avoided certain stipulations of the 1969 reform act for charitable institutions due to legal filings by Hughes to change its operational status, with his objections going directly to the White House.

The institute moved to Coconut Grove, Florida, in the mid-1970s and then to Bethesda, Maryland, in 1976.

In 1993, the institute moved to its headquarters in Chevy Chase, Maryland.

It was not until after Hughes's death in 1976 that the institute's profile increased from an annual budget of $4 million in 1975 to $15 million in 1978 and prior to Hughes Aircraft sale the number had peaked to $200 million per year. At the time of the sale Hughes Aircraft employed 75,000 people and vast amounts of money from the approximate annual revenue of $6 billion were put into Hughes Aircraft internal research and development rather than the medical institute. Most of the money for the medical institute came from the operations at Ground System Group responsible for providing Air Defense Systems to NATO, Pacific Rim, and the USA. In this period it focused its mission on genetics, immunology, and molecular biology. Since Hughes died without a will as the sole trustee of the HHMI, the institute was involved in lengthy court proceedings to determine whether it would benefit from Hughes's fortune. In April 1984, a court appointed new trustees for the institute's holdings.

In January 1985 the trustees announced they would sell Hughes Aircraft by private sale or public stock offering. On June 5, 1985 General Motors (GM) was announced as the winner of a secretive five-month, sealed-bid auction. The purchase was completed on December 20, 1985, for an estimated $5.2 billion, $2.7 billion in cash and the rest in 50 million shares of GM Class H stock. The proceeds caused the institute to grow dramatically.

HHMI completed the building of a new research campus in Ashburn, Virginia called Janelia Research Campus in October 2006. It is modeled after AT&T's Bell Labs and the Medical Research Council's Laboratory of Molecular Biology. The campus also features apartments for visiting researchers.

In 2007, HHMI and the publisher Elsevier announced they have established an agreement to make author manuscripts of HHMI research articles published in Elsevier and Cell Press journals publicly available six months following final publication. The agreement takes effect for articles published after September 1, 2007.

In 2008, the Trustees of the Howard Hughes Medical Institute selected Robert Tjian as the new president of HHMI.

In 2009, HHMI awarded fifty researchers, as part of the HHMI Early Career Scientist Competition.

In 2014, the institute created a new round of its primary award competition, for a total of $150 million in award money from 2015 to 2012. The institute is expanding the Ashburn campus in 2019.

In 2016, the HHMI Trustees selected Erin K. O'Shea, a previous Vice President and Chief Scientific Officer at the institute, the new president of HHMI.

In 2022, HHMI began to require immediate open access to publications from its research.

Assets
 the Howard Hughes Medical Institute had assets of $22,588,928,000.

Funding details
Funding details :

See also
List of wealthiest foundations

References and notes

External links

60 Minutes news feature "Howard Hughes: Patron Of Science?"

Chevy Chase, Maryland
Medical research institutes in Maryland
Howard Hughes
Biomedical research foundations
Medical and health foundations in the United States
Organizations established in 1953
1953 establishments in Maryland
Biotechnology organizations